Bertha Rabbinowicz-Kreidmann (died May 16, 1871) was a Hebrew poet and letter writer.

Her father, Moshe Aharon Kreidmann, was an educated man from Iași who encouraged his daughter's literary pursuits. She moved to Vienna after her marriage to Baruch Rabbinowicz, who was studying medicine there. She did not live happily with her husband and fell into a depression, which ultimately led her to take her own life at the age of 22.

References

1871 deaths
19th-century Romanian Jews
Jewish women writers
People of the Haskalah
Suicides by jumping in Austria
Writers from Iași